Mark George may refer to:

Mark George (English cricketer) (born 1975)
Mark George (Australian cricketer) (born 1977)
Mark S. George (born 1958), American neuroscientist

See also
George Marks (disambiguation)